Palisota pynaertii is a species of plant in the Commelinaceae family, described in 1903. It may be endemic to the Democratic Republic of the Congo (Zaïre) in central Africa.

References

pynaertii
Endemic flora of the Democratic Republic of the Congo
Plants described in 1903
Taxa named by Émile Auguste Joseph De Wildeman